Uttara Mhatre Kher (29 December 1963) is an Indian former model and beauty pageant contestant.

Personal life 

Kher is married to Adwait Kher (also a former model and son of actress Usha Kiran), making Tanvi Azmi her sister-in-law. She has two daughters Saiyami Kher and Saunskruti Kher.

Career 
Kher won the Navy Queen Ball in 1981. In 1982, she was crowned Femina Miss India World and represented India at the Miss World 1982 pageant.

After her marriage, she and her husband moved to Nashik where they own three restaurants named Tandoor, Aangan and The Bombay Talkies.

See also 
India at Big Four international beauty pageants
Miss World

References

Living people
Female models from Maharashtra
1963 births
Miss World 1982 delegates
Indian beauty pageant winners
Maharashtra Navnirman Sena politicians